Maria Ernestam (born 28 November 1959) is a Swedish author and journalist.

Life and career
Ernestam grew up in Uppsala, Sweden. She is a journalist, having earned her journalism degree at the University of Gothenburg. In addition, Ernestam studied English literature and mathematics at the University of Uppsala. Ernestam also studied in the United States, where she took a Master of Arts in political science, focusing on international relations, at the University of Kansas. She then moved to Germany, where she stayed for eleven years in Frankfurt am Main, as a correspondent for the Swedish business weekly Veckans affärer and Swedish medical weekly Dagens medicin.

In 2005, Maria Ernestam had her first novel published, "Caipirinha with Death" (Caipirinha med Döden). It tells a tale of Death knocking at the wrong door and meeting a woman who starts working for him. In Russia the book was compared to Mikhail Bulgakov's "The Master and Margarita". Since then Ernestam has written seven more novels and contributed to anthologies and short-story selections. Ernestam lives in Stockholm with her husband and two children.

Authorship
Maria Ernestam's books have been described as dramatic psychological relationship novels spiced with twists and drastic humor. The books have been sold to 13 countries and reached top list placements in Germany and Taiwan. More than half a million copies have been sold.

Prizes and awards
In France, Maria Ernestam received the booksellers' prize Prix Page des Libraires for Buster's Ears (Busters öron). The same book received the French awards Prix La Passerelle and Prix de l'Armitière. Ernestam's French translator Esther Sermage was awarded the prize for best translation of foreign literature into French for "Buster's Ears". She received the prize at Lire en Poche in Gradignan. Always with you (Alltid hos dig) was nominated for the Prix Littéraire Cezan Inter-CE and for the Stora Läsarpriset (The grand Readers' prize).

Selected works
2016 – The Wounded Pianist (Den sårade pianisten). Novel 
2014 – An Eye for and Eye, and a Paw for a Paw (Öga för öga, tass för tass). Novel
2012 – Daughter's of the Marionettes (Marionetternas döttrar). Novel
2010 – On the Other Side of the Sun (På andra sidan solen). Novel
2010 – Drama Queens. Selection of short stories
2009 – My Grandmother's Story (Min mormors historia). Anthology
2008 – Always With You (Alltid hos dig). Novel
2007 – Cleopatra's Comb (Kleopatras kam). Novel
2006 – Buster's Ears (Busters öron). Novel
2005 – Caipirinha with Death (Caipirinha med Döden). Novel

References

Sources
Månpocket (12-10-10) 
Forum (26 04 10) 
UNT/Kultur (26 04 10)
Grand agency (04 10 12)
Bokia (04 10 12)
Official web site (24 11 15)

External links
Official web site

1959 births
Living people
21st-century Swedish writers
University of Gothenburg alumni
21st-century Swedish women writers